Henry Weir (August 22, 1840 – April 22, 1927) was an American soldier who was awarded the Medal of Honor for his actions in the American Civil War. Weir was presented his medal on 18 May, 1899 for his actions as a captain in the U.S Volunteers at St. Mary's Church, Virginia on Jun 24, 1864. He was born in West Point, New York and died in Warwick, New York. He is buried in The Green-Wood Wood Cemetery in Brooklyn, New York.

Medal of Honor Citation 
The division being hard pressed and falling back, this officer dismounted, gave his horse to a wounded officer, and thus enabled him to escape. Afterwards, on foot, Captain Weir rallied and took command of some stragglers and helped to repel the last charge of the enemy.

References 

1840 births
1927 deaths
American Civil War recipients of the Medal of Honor